Mehdi Mehdikhani (born 28 July 1997 in Kermanshah) is an Iranian professional footballer who plays as a forward for Persian Gulf Pro League club Esteghlal FC.

Club career

Persepolis 
On 16 November 2020, Mehdikhani signed a two-year contract with Persian Gulf Pro League champions Persepolis.

Club career statistics

Honours
Persepolis
Iranian Super Cup ; Runner-Up (1): 2021

References

External links
 Mehdi Mehdikhani at FIFA.com
 Mehdi Mehdikhani at FFIRI.ir
Mehdi Mehdikhani on instagram

Living people
Iranian footballers
Iran under-20 international footballers
Iranian expatriate footballers
Shahr Khodro F.C. players
1997 births
People from Kermanshah Province
Association football forwards
Footballers at the 2018 Asian Games
Asian Games competitors for Iran
Persian Gulf Pro League players
Croatian Football League players
NK Varaždin players
Expatriate footballers in Croatia
Persepolis F.C. players